Konstantinos Kariotis (born 1 October 1971) is a Greek rower. He competed in the men's single sculls event at the 1992 Summer Olympics.

References

1971 births
Living people
Greek male rowers
Olympic rowers of Greece
Rowers at the 1992 Summer Olympics
Sportspeople from Stuttgart